Sueviota larsonae, the Larson's sueviota, is a species of fish in the family Gobiidae. found in the Western Central Pacific .This species reaches a length of .

Entymology
The fish is named for Helen K. Larson.

References

larsonae
Taxa named by Richard Winterbottom
Taxa named by Douglass F. Hoese
Fish described in 1988